Apostolos Tsilingiris (born 6 September 2000) is a Greek professional footballer who plays as a goalkeeper for Cypriot First Division club APOEL.

Career

Aris
On 29 August 2019, the 19-year-old Tsilingiris signed a one-year contract with Aris.

On 10 November 2019, he made his debut with the club as a substitution, against Asteras Tripolis in a season game, when the starter goalkeeper Fabian Ehmann sent off. On 24 November 2019, the teenage goalkeeper was gifted his full debut in the Super League against AEK Athens. Despite the occasion, Tsilingiris produced a near flawless performance, only being beaten by Petros Mantalos from the penalty spot as the match ended 1–1 and he named as the Man of the match.

Career statistics

Club

References

2000 births
Living people
Greek footballers
Greek expatriate footballers
Super League Greece players
Super League Greece 2 players
Aris Thessaloniki F.C. players
APOEL FC players
Expatriate footballers in Cyprus
Association football goalkeepers
Footballers from Xanthi